Jean-Marie Rolland (born 25 September 1950 in Algiers) is a member of the National Assembly of France.  He represents the Yonne department,  and is a member of the Union for a Popular Movement.

References

1950 births
Living people
People from Algiers
People of French Algeria
Pieds-Noirs
Union for a Popular Movement politicians
Deputies of the 12th National Assembly of the French Fifth Republic
Deputies of the 13th National Assembly of the French Fifth Republic